Joaquim "Jack" M. Martins (born June 19, 1967) is an American attorney and politician serving as a member of the New York State Senate for the 7th district. A Republican, he previously served as mayor of Mineola, New York.

Early life and education
Martins is a first-generation Portuguese American. He was born in Queens, New York, to parents who emigrated to the United States in the 1960s. He has two brothers and two sisters and was raised in Mineola. Upon graduating from Chaminade High School, he received a bachelor's degree in political science from American University in 1988. Additionally, Martins received a Juris Doctor from St. John's University School of Law in 1991.

Political career

Mayor of Mineola (2004–2010)
Martins was elected mayor of the Village of Mineola, New York in 2003.

2008 congressional campaign
In 2008, Martins ran for Congress against incumbent Democratic U.S. Representative Carolyn McCarthy (D-Mineola). He was defeated by a wide margin.

New York State Senate (2011–2016)
Martins won election to the New York State Senate in 2010 as the representative for New York's 7th State Senate district. He defeated incumbent Democratic senator Craig M. Johnson by 451 votes. The election results were not certified until December 4, 2010. Johnson challenged the results and demanded a hand recount, but the New York Court of Appeals rejected his appeal on December 20, 2010.

As Senator, Martins voted for the law creating New York State's property tax cap, voted to cut income taxes for middle-class homeowners, voted to repeal the MTA payroll tax for small businesses and schools, and supported repealing the MTA payroll tax in its entirety. He authored laws reducing busing costs for school districts; creating a truss notification system to improve safety for volunteer firefighters; and establishing a new state fund to help homeless veterans.

In 2011, Martins voted against allowing same-sex marriage in New York during rollcall for the Marriage Equality Act, which narrowly passed, legalizing it by 33 to 29.

Martins was highly critical of the New York State Education Department's implementation of the Common Core standards and called for the resignation of the State's Commissioner of Education for cancelling public forums on the issue with parents and teachers. While in the Senate, Martins repeatedly led Long Island's 31 state legislators in the number of bills sponsored that were ultimately passed by both houses of the State Legislature.

In February 2016, Martins and Assemblywoman Michelle Schimel called for new state funding to support a comprehensive groundwater study for Long Island. An expanded version of their proposal was adopted by Governor Andrew Cuomo.

Martins sponsored legislation that would prevent New York from entering into a state contract or investment with those who boycott Israel or other American allies.

Martins served as chairman of the State Senate's Labor Committee and was co-chair of the Senate's Task Force on Workforce Development. He previously chaired the Senate's Commerce, Economic Development and Small Business Committee and the Senate's Local Government Committee. Martins also served on the New York State Mandate Relief Council, which was created to help reduce costs for local governments and school districts by eliminating or reforming regulations.

2016 congressional campaign
Martins was the Republican nominee in the 2016 election to represent New York's 3rd congressional district in the United States House of Representatives, and received the endorsement of the Republican Party, Conservative Party and the Independence Party. Martins was defeated by Democrat Thomas Suozzi in the general election. Suozzi won 53% of the vote to Martins' 47%.

2017 Nassau County executive campaign
On April 26, 2017, Martins announced that he would run for Nassau County executive. Martins received the GOP nomination for County Executive and was uncontested in the primary. Martins was defeated by the Democratic nominee, Nassau County legislator Laura Curran, in the November 7, 2017, election; Curran won 51% of the vote to Martins' 48%.

2023 congressional speculation 
Amid calls for newly seated congressman George Santos to resign, Martins was mentioned as a possible replacement.

Personal life
As of 2018, Martins is a board member of the Henry Viscardi School. He is a recipient of the Melvin Jones Fellowship Award, the Lions Club's highest honor. He was honored as the 2012 Portuguese Man of the Year during Nassau County's first ever public event recognizing the Portuguese Community on Long Island. He and his wife, Paula, have four daughters.

Election results
November 2017 General Election, Nassau County Executive
{| class="Wikitable"
| Jack Martins (REP - Reform Party - TRP - CON) - 139,204
|-
|Laura Curran (DEM) - 147,102
|}
 November 2016 General Election, US House of Representatives, 3rd CD
{| class="Wikitable"
| Jack Martins (REP - IND - CON)  || ... || 152,304
|-
| Thomas R. Suozzi (DEM) || ... || 171,775
|}
 November 2014 General Election, NYS Senate, 7th SD
{| class="Wikitable"
| Jack M. Martins (REP - IND - CON - Tax Revolt Party (TRP)) || ... || 40,465 
|-
| Adam M. Haber (DEM - WFP - GRE - Women's Equality Party(WEP))|| ... || 31,552
|}

 November 2012 General Election, NYS Senate, 7th SD
{| class="Wikitable"
| Jack M. Martins (REP - IND - CON - Tax Revolt Party (TRP)) || ... || 58,039 
|-
| Daniel S. Ross (DEM - WFP)|| ... || 53,987
|}

 November 2010 General Election, NYS Senate, 7th SD
{| class="Wikitable"
| Jack M. Martins (REP - IND - CON) || ... || 42,928
|-
| Craig M. Johnson (DEM) || ... || 42,477
|}

References

1967 births
Living people
American people of Portuguese descent
Mayors of places in New York (state)
New York (state) lawyers
Republican Party New York (state) state senators
People from Long Island
Catholics from New York (state)
Chaminade High School alumni
American University School of Public Affairs alumni
St. John's University School of Law alumni
21st-century American politicians